HMIS Rohilkhand (J180) was a  built for the Royal Navy, but transferred to the Royal Indian Navy during the Second World War.

Design and description
The Bangor class was designed as a small minesweeper that could be easily built in large numbers by civilian shipyards; as steam turbines were difficult to manufacture, the ships were designed to accept a wide variety of engines. The ship's complement consisted of 60 officers and ratings.

She was powered by two Parsons geared steam turbines, each driving one shaft, using steam provided by two Admiralty three-drum boilers.

The turbine-powered Bangors were armed with a 12-pounder  anti-aircraft gun and a single QF 2-pounder (4 cm) AA gun. In some ships the 2-pounder was replaced a single or twin  20 mm Oerlikon AA gun, while most ships were fitted with four additional single Oerlikon mounts over the course of the war. For escort work, her minesweeping gear could be exchanged for around 40 depth charges.

Construction and career
HMIS Rohilkhand was ordered from the William Hamilton and Company originally for the Royal Navy as HMS Padstow in 1939. However, before she was launched, she was transferred to the Royal Indian Navy and eventually commissioned as Rohilkhand. She was a part of the Eastern Fleet, and escorted numerous convoys between Africa, British India and Australia in 1943-45.

References

Bibliography
 

 

Bangor-class minesweepers of the Royal Indian Navy
1942 ships
Ships built on the River Clyde
World War II minesweepers of India
Rohilkhand